Germán Crespo Sánchez (born 19 November 1975) is a Spanish retired footballer who played as a midfielder, and is the manager of Córdoba CF.

Playing career
Born in Granada, Andalusia, Crespo began his senior career with hometown side Club Recreativo Granada in Tercera División, after playing for the youth sides of Real Madrid and Granada CF.

After struggling severely with injuries, Crespo moved to CP Granada 74 in the fourth tier in 2000. He retired in 2002, aged just 26.

Managerial career
After retiring, Crespo became the manager of Arenas CD's Cadete squad, before being named Kiki's assistant at Granada in 2005. He left the club on 1 March of the following year, and was appointed manager of CF Sierra Nevada Cenes in 2006.

After leading Sierra Nevada to Primera Andaluza in his first season, Crespo was named in charge of fellow fifth tier side Atarfe Industrial CF in 2009, after a one-year spell at CD Huétor Vega. He achieved promotion to the fourth division in 2012, and left in June 2014 to take over UD Maracena.

Crespo left Maracena in 2015, and spent a year without coaching before being appointed at CD Huétor Tájar on 25 June 2016. He was named in charge of Real Jaén on 28 May 2018, but was dismissed on 1 July of the following year.

On 4 January 2020, Crespo moved abroad after being appointed in charge of Lincoln Red Imps FC in Gibraltar. He left the side on 21 May, and was appointed manager of Córdoba CF's reserves six days later.

On 19 April 2021, Crespo was named in charge of the first team of the Blanquiverdes, replacing sacked Pablo Alfaro. He was confirmed as manager for the 2021–22 season on 18 June 2021, and led the club to promotion to Primera Federación at the end of the campaign; on 28 October 2022, he renewed his contract until 2026.

Managerial statistics

References

External links

1979 births
Living people
Footballers from Granada
Spanish footballers
Association football midfielders
Segunda División B players
Tercera División players
Club Recreativo Granada players
Granada CF footballers
Spanish football managers
Primera Federación managers
Segunda División B managers
Segunda Federación managers
Tercera División managers
Real Jaén managers
Córdoba CF B managers
Córdoba CF managers
Lincoln Red Imps F.C. managers
Spanish expatriate football managers
Spanish expatriate sportspeople in Gibraltar
Expatriate football managers in Gibraltar